École secondaire Eulalie-Durocher is a francophone secondary public mixed school located in Mercier-Hochelaga-Maisonneuve borough in Montreal. Part of the Centre de services scolaire de Montréal (CSSDM), it was originally in the catholic School board Commission des écoles catholiques de Montréal (CECM) before the 1998 reorganization of School boards from religious communities into linguistic communities in Quebec. In 2019, the school has 748 students.

History
First established in 1961, this school was constructed on a land of another school, the Académie La Salle, demolished by a fire in 1914.

The school is named in honor of Marie-Rose Durocher, born Eulalie Durocher (1811-1849), a quebecer catholic educator who founded the Sisters of the Holy Names of Jesus and Mary. She was beatified (bestows title « Blessed ») by the Roman Catholic Church by decree of Pope John Paul II in 1982.

School and facilities
The establishment is modern, has three stories with lots of windows covered with brown bricks and some insertions in concrete. It contains mainly regular classrooms, rooms for computer labs, science labs, a cafeteria, a student café, a library, a Coop, a weight room and an auditorium. The school also comprises a small gymnasium and, outside, a basketball court and a soccer field.

Programs and services
The school offers a program for students from grade 9 to grade 11 for drop-out students from 16 to 21 years old. The school offers full-time and part-time study programs in general education curriculum.  there are, on average, 45 teachers and about 700–1,000 students.

Professional services are offered to the students: specialized educators, psychoeducator, education specialist, resources teachers, nurse, guidance counsellor, etc.

Activities
Back-to-school party
Basketball
Battle of the books
Chess
Christmas show
Cosom hockey
French Week
Graduation Ball
Halloween
Improvisational Theatre
Meritas Gala
Movies
Multicultural Week
Noon Workshops
Outdoor sports
Physical Education Week
Soccer
Sugar shack trip
Weight training
Year end party

References

External links
 École secondaire Eulalie-Durocher 
 École secondaire Eulalie-Durocher  (Archive)

High schools in Montreal
1961 establishments in Quebec
Educational institutions established in 1961